Duesberg may refer to:

Peter Duesberg, molecular biologist and AIDS denialist
Duesberg hypothesis, disproven claim that HIV does not cause AIDS
Museum François Duesberg, a museum of decorative arts in Belgium 
Helen Tobias-Duesberg, Estonian–American composer